Kenneth Alan "Buzz" Shaw (born January 31, 1939) is an American academic and university executive who served as the 10th Chancellor and President of Syracuse University, 4th President of the University of Wisconsin System, and 2nd President of the Southern Illinois University System.

Biography 
Born in Granite City, Illinois, Shaw received his bachelor's degree from Illinois State University, his masters from University of Illinois and his doctorate from Purdue University. Shaw taught at Rich Township High School in Park Forest, Illinois. He then taught at Illinois State University and did administrative work.

He is the author of more than 40 articles dealing with higher education and leadership. His first book, "The Successful President," was published in 1999; his second, "The Intentional Leader," which deals with the generic understandings and skills needed by every leader or would-be leader, was published in 2005.

In 1991, Shaw was recruited to be the Chancellor and President at Syracuse University by then Chair of Syracuse Board of Trustees H. Douglas Barclay. He retired from the position at the end of the 2003–2004 school year and was replaced by Nancy Cantor.

Awards and recognition 
Shaw was inducted as a Laureate of The Lincoln Academy of Illinois and awarded the Order of Lincoln (the State's highest honor) by the Governor of Illinois in 2008 in the area of Education.

References

1939 births
Living people
People from Granite City, Illinois
Presidents of Syracuse University
Illinois State Redbirds men's basketball players
Southern Illinois University people
University of Wisconsin–Madison faculty
Presidents of the University of Wisconsin System
American men's basketball players
University of Illinois alumni
Purdue University College of Education alumni
Writers from Illinois
Writers from New York (state)
Writers from Wisconsin